The Ballad Hits is the second greatest hits compilation album by Swedish pop duo Roxette, released on 4 November 2002 by Roxette Recordings and Capitol Records. It was the first of a two-part series of "best of" albums released by the duo in quick succession, and was followed by The Pop Hits in March 2003. Two new songs were recorded specially for The Ballad Hits: lead single "A Thing About You" and "Breathe". The album was a commercial success upon release, and has been certified gold or platinum in a number of territories.

Release and promotion
The album contains two newly recorded songs: "Breathe" and "A Thing About You", which was issued as the album's lead single on 14 October 2002. CD versions of the album released on mainland Europe, as well as Brazil and Russia, feature copy protection. A limited edition of the compilation containing a bonus EP of previously unreleased tracks was also released in select territories. The EP contained "The Weight of the World", "It Hurts" and "Every Day", along with a fourth song, "See Me", which had previously been released as a b-side on the duo's 1999 single "Salvation". Its release in Australia, the United Kingdom and the United States was timed to coincide with Valentine's Day of 2003. The album was due to be promoted by Roxette performing with an orchestra at the pan-European concert series Night of the Proms. However, Roxette had to be pull out of the event when singer Marie Fredriksson was diagnosed with a brain tumour.

Critical reception

The compilation received generally positive reviews. William Ruhlmann of AllMusic described Roxette as a "much bigger act in Europe than in America. Indeed, as far as the United States is concerned, there are only five chart entries [on the album], and only three real hits. ... Americans may have lost interest at about the time that Nirvana came roaring in from the Northwest, but Roxette has been consistent, scoring hits throughout the 90's and beyond with their usual practice of attractive pop hooks and Marie Fredriksson's emotive vocals." He summarised by writing that the album contained "plenty of ear candy" and rated it 3 stars out of 5. A writer for Uncut gave a positive review as well, saying that the album contained "not ballads in the conventional folksy sense, but rather, at their best, pomp-rock steamrollers crushing the puny likes of Jennifer Rush with the mighty weight of their sentimentality." They also rated the album 3 stars out of five, and called it "A must for drama queens and pop aficionados alike."

Commercial performance
The album was successful throughout Europe, particularly in Scandinavia. It peaked within the top five in both Denmark and the duo's native Sweden, and was certified gold in both territories for shipments in excess of 25,000 and 30,000 units, respectively. It reached number eight on the Norwegian Albums Chart, and was certified platinum by the IFPI there for sales in excess of 40,000 copies. It also reached the top ten in Belgium, Germany, the Netherlands, and Switzerland, and was certified gold in both of the latter territories for shipments in excess of 40,000 and 20,000 units, respectively.

The Ballad Hits was promoted in the United Kingdom with a high-profile marketing campaign, which included airing commercials for the album during the popular British soap opera Coronation Street over the week leading up to Valentine's Day. The album debuted at number 23 on the UK Albums Chart on the chart dated 9 February 2003, before rising to its peak of number 11 on its second week. 
 It peaked even higher on the Scottish Albums Chart, reaching number seven there. It was certified silver by the British Phonographic Industry for shipments in excess of 60,000 units.

Track listing

Personnel
Credits adapted from the liner notes of The Ballad Hits.

 Roxette are Per Gessle and Marie Fredriksson
 Recorded in various studios in Sweden, Italy and Spain between November 1987 and June 2002.
 All songs produced by Clarence Öfwerman, except tracks 1 and 15 by Öfwerman and Per Gessle, tracks 11, 12 and 13 by Fredriksson, Gessle, Michael Ilbert and Öfwerman, and track 14 by Fredriksson, Gessle and Öfwerman.
 Mixed by Ronny Lahti, Clarence Öfwerman and Per Gessle at Polar Studios, Stockholm in June 2002.
 Mastered by George Marino at Sterling Sound Studios, New York City in July 2002.

Musicians
 Marie Fredriksson – lead and background vocals; piano ; keyboards ; mixing
 Per Gessle – lead and background vocals; acoustic guitar ; 12-stringed acoustic guitar ; string arrangement ; engineering; programming; mixing
 Per "Pelle" Alsing – drums 
 Anders Herrlin – bass guitar ; engineering and programming 
 Jonas Isacsson – acoustic and electric guitars; additional bass guitar 
 Christer Jansson – drums ; percussion 
 Christoffer Lundquist – background vocals ; acoustic guitar ; bass guitar ; extended-range bass ; zither 
 Mats "MP" Persson – electric guitar ; string arrangement ; engineering 
 Clarence Öfwerman – keyboards ; Synclavier ; tambourine ; synthesizer and tubular bells ; string arrangements ; programming

Additional musicians
 Micke Andersson – 12-stringed acoustic and Rickenbacker guitars 
 Milla Andersson – background vocals 
 Vicki Benckert – background vocals 
 Magnus Blom – alto saxophone 
 Hasse Dyvik – trumpet and flugelhorn 
 Bo Eriksson – oboe 
 Anders Evaldsson – trombone 
 Staffan Öfwerman – background vocals 
 Stockholm Session Strings – orchestration 
 Stockholms Nya Kammarorkester  – orchestration 

Technical personnel
 Jonas Åkerlund – photography and art direction
 Marie Dimberg – management
 Mattias Edwall – photography
 Humberto Gatica – mixing 
 Mats Holmquist – string arrangements ; conducting 
 Michael Ilbert – string arrangement ; engineering, programming and mixing 
 Ronny Lahti – engineering 
 Sven Lindström – liner notes
 Sarah Sheppard – photography and art direction
 Shooting Star – programming 
 Alar Suurna – engineering and mixing

Charts

Weekly charts

Year-end charts

Certifications

References

External links 
 

2002 compilation albums
Roxette compilation albums
EMI Records compilation albums